Hanni Beronius (born 21 January 1990) is a Swedish beauty queen who was crowned Miss Universe Sweden in 2012. Beronius represented Sweden in Miss Universe 2012 in Las Vegas. Her father is Swedish and her mother was brought up in Iran by a Swedish mother and Persian father. Beronius lives in Gothenburg, Sweden. She is the first Swedish contestant at Miss Universe to be of Persian descent. In 2010, Beronius filed a complaint to the police about people taking her photos and using them to create fake Facebook accounts, which led to Beronius being harassed by people via phonecalls and mobile texts messages. On 28 November 2012, Beronius appeared as the covergirl and in an editorial on the Washington magazine The Georgetowner.

References

External links

Blog Expressen
Miss Universe 2012 Personal Profile
November edition of the Georgetowner

1990 births
Swedish female models
Swedish beauty pageant winners
Miss Universe 2012 contestants
Swedish people of Iranian descent
People from Kungsbacka
Living people